The Lost Limited is a 1927 American silent action film directed by J.P. McGowan and starring Reed Howes, Ruth Dwyer and Henry A. Barrows.

Cast
 Reed Howes as Leonard Hathaway 
 Ruth Dwyer as Nora Murphy 
 Henry A. Barrows as Silas Brownley 
 Billy Franey as Rambling Red 
 J.P. McGowan as Thomas Webber 
 George B. French
 Dot Farley

References

Bibliography
 Munden, Kenneth White. The American Film Institute Catalog of Motion Pictures Produced in the United States, Part 1. University of California Press, 1997.

External links
 

1927 films
1920s action films
American silent feature films
American action films
American black-and-white films
Films directed by J. P. McGowan
Rail transport films
Rayart Pictures films
1920s English-language films
1920s American films